Cocalodes is a genus of jumping spiders that was first described by Reginald Innes Pocock in 1897. The name is an alteration of the salticid genus Cocalus.

Species
 it contains twelve species, found only in Indonesia and Papua New Guinea:
Cocalodes cygnatus Wanless, 1982 – Indonesia
Cocalodes expers Wanless, 1982 – New Guinea
Cocalodes innotabilis Wanless, 1982 – New Guinea
Cocalodes leptopus Pocock, 1897 (type) – Indonesia
Cocalodes longicornis Wanless, 1982 – New Guinea
Cocalodes longipes (Thorell, 1881) – Indonesia, New Guinea
Cocalodes macellus (Thorell, 1878) – Indonesia, New Guinea
Cocalodes papuanus Simon, 1900 – New Guinea
Cocalodes platnicki Wanless, 1982 – New Guinea
Cocalodes protervus (Thorell, 1881) – New Guinea
Cocalodes thoracicus Szombathy, 1915 – New Guinea
Cocalodes turgidus Wanless, 1982 – New Guinea

References

Salticidae
Salticidae genera
Spiders of Asia
Taxa named by R. I. Pocock